Katz Castle is a castle above the German town of St. Goarshausen in Rhineland-Palatinate. The castle stands on a ledge looking downstream from the riverside at St. Goar. It was first built around 1371 by Count William II of Katzenelnbogen. The castle was bombarded in 1806 by Napoleon and rebuilt in the late 19th century, in 1896–98. It is now privately owned, and not open for visitors.

Description

Etymology

After the original castle "Burg Katzenelnbogen" (lit. Castle [of] Cat's Elbow) this medieval fortress castle is officially known as Burg Neukatzenelnbogen (Castle [of] New Cat's Elbow). It used to be and still is, however, comfortably and commonly contracted to "die [Burg] Katz" ("the [Castle] Cat").

As such, it is popularly linked with Burg Maus ("the [Castle] Mouse"), which was indeed erected in closest possible vicinity as its military counterpart.

Architecture
The castle is of compact layout, consisting mainly of a great hall and a massive bergfried, originally 40 metres tall, on the uphill side.

In 1435, the Counts of Katzenelnbogen were the first to plant Riesling grapes in their vineyard.

Katz Castle and its surroundings are the place of action for the Belgian comic book L'Orgue du Diable in the Yoko Tsuno series by Roger Leloup.

Gallery

Notes and references

External links

 Katz Castle
 Katz Castle in the Lorelei Valley
 Katz Castle near the Lorelei

Buildings and structures completed in 1371
Katz